Sir Bruce Greatbatch,  (10 June 1917 – 20 July 1989) was the British Governor of the Seychelles from 1969 to 1973.

Biography
Greatbatch was educated at Malvern and Brasenose College in the University of Oxford. Greatbatch oversaw the forced deportation of the Chagossians between 1968 and 1973. He and his subordinate, John Rawling Todd, were accused of ordering the island's dog population of 1,000 to be gassed as a means of intimidating the Chagossians before deportation. The deportation was carried out at the request of the United States government in order to construct a military base on Diego Garcia.

References

External links
"British-US conspiracy to steal a nation" by John Pilger

1917 births
1989 deaths
People educated at Malvern College
Alumni of Brasenose College, Oxford
Governors of British Seychelles
Knights Commander of the Royal Victorian Order
Companions of the Order of St Michael and St George
Members of the Order of the British Empire
Knights of the Order of St John
British expatriates in Seychelles